AfroBasket 2007 was the 24th FIBA Africa Championship, played under the auspices of the Fédération Internationale de Basketball, the basketball sport governing body, and the African zone thereof. The tournament was hosted by Angola, in the cities of Benguela, Cabinda, Huambo and Lubango.

Angola won its fifth consecutive African championship and ninth overall by beating Cameroon 86-72 in the championship game.  Cape Verde won the bronze medal game over Egypt. Angola qualified for the 2008 Summer Olympics in Beijing whereas Cameroon and Cape Verde qualified for the 2008 Olympic qualifying tournament. Angola's Joaquim Gomes claimed the tournament's Most Valuable Player award.

Venues

Qualification

Squads

Preliminary round
All times are in local time UTC+1

Group A

Group B

Group C

Group D

Classification round

9th-16th classification

13th-16th classification

9th-12th classification

15th place

13th place

11th place

9th place

Knockout round

Quarterfinals

5th-8th classification

Semifinals

7th place

5th place

Bronze-medal match

Final

Final standings

Awards

All-Tournament Team
  Marques Houtman
  Olímpio Cipriano
  Luc Mbah a Moute
  Joaquim Gomes
  Rodrigo Mascarenhas

Statistical Leaders

Individual Tournament Highs

Points

Rebounds

Assists

Steals

Blocks

Minutes

Individual Game Highs

Team Tournament Highs

Points per Game

Total Points

Rebounds

Assists

Steals

Blocks

2-point field goal percentage

3-point field goal percentage

Free throw percentage

Team Game highs

See also
 2007 FIBA Africa Clubs Champions Cup

References

External links
Official website
Afrobasket Forum
Interbasket Afrobasket coverage

 
2007
2007–08 in Angolan basketball
2007 in African basketball
International basketball competitions hosted by Angola
August 2007 sports events in Africa